The registered German minority in Poland at the 2011 national census consisted of 148,000 people, of whom 64,000 declared both German and Polish ethnicities and 45,000 solely German ethnicity. At a 2002 census there were 152,900 people declaring German ethnicity.

The German language is spoken in certain areas in Opole Voivodeship, where most of the minority resides, and in Silesian Voivodeship. German-speakers first came to these regions (present-day Opole and Silesian Voivodeships) during the Late Middle Ages. However, there are no localities in either Upper Silesia or Poland as a whole where German could be considered a language of everyday communication. The predominant home or family language of Poland's German minority in Upper Silesia used to be the Silesian German language (mainly Oberschlesisch dialect, but also Mundart des Brieg-Grottkauer Landes was used west of Opole), but since 1945 Standard German replaced it as these Silesian German dialects went generally out of use except among the oldest generations which have by now completely died off. The German Minority electoral list currently has one seat in the Sejm of the Republic of Poland (there were four from 1993 to 1997), benefiting from the current provision in Polish election law which exempts national minorities from the 5% national threshold.

In the school year of 2014/15 there were 387 elementary schools in Poland (all in Upper Silesia), with over 37,000 students, in which German was taught as a minority language (that is, at least for three periods of 45 minutes in a week), hence de facto as a subject. There were no minority schools with German as the language of instruction, though there were three asymmetrically bilingual (Polish-German) schools, where most subjects were taught through the medium of Polish. Most members of the German minority are Roman Catholic, while some are Lutheran Protestants (the Evangelical-Augsburg Church).

Germans in Poland today

According to the 2002 census, most of the Germans in Poland (92.9%) live in Silesia: 104,399 in the Opole Voivodeship, i.e. 71.0% of all Germans in Poland and a share of 9.9% of the local population; 30,531 in the Silesian Voivodeship, i.e. 20.8% of all Germans in Poland and 0.6% of the local population; plus 1,792 in the Lower Silesian Voivodeship, i.e. 1.2% of all Germans in Poland, though only 0.06% of the local population. A second region with a notable German minority is Masuria, with 4,311 living in the Warmian-Masurian Voivodeship, corresponding to 2.9% of all Germans in Poland, and 0.3% of the local population.

Towns with particularly high concentrations of German speakers in Opole Voivodeship include: Strzelce Opolskie; Dobrodzien; Prudnik; Głogówek; and Gogolin.

In the remaining 12 voivodeships of Poland, the percentage of Germans in the population does not exceed 0.09%:

Poland is also the third most frequent destination for migrant Germans searching for work, after the United States and Switzerland.

History of Germans in Poland 

German migration into areas that form part of present-day Poland began with the medieval Ostsiedlung (see also Walddeutsche in the Subcarpathian region). Regions which subsequently became part of the Kingdom of Prussia - Lower Silesia, East Brandenburg, Pomerania and East Prussia - were almost completely German by the High Middle Ages. In other areas of modern-day Poland there were substantial German populations, most notably in the historical regions of Pomerelia, Upper Silesia, and Posen or Greater Poland. Lutheran Germans settled numerous "Olęder" villages along the Vistula River and its tributaries during the 17th, 18th and 19th centuries. In the 19th century, Germans became actively involved in developing the clothmaking industry in what is now central Poland. Over 3,000 villages and towns within Russian Poland are recorded as having German residents. Many of these Germans remained east of the Curzon line after World War I ended in 1918, including a significant number in Volhynia. In the late-19th century, some Germans moved westward during the Ostflucht, while a Prussian Settlement Commission established others in Central Poland.

According to the 1931 census, around 740,000 German speakers lived in Poland (2.3% of the population). Their minority rights were protected by the Little Treaty of Versailles of 1919. The right to appeal to the League of Nations however was renounced in 1934, officially due to Germany's withdrawal from the League (September 1933) after Adolf Hitler became German Chancellor in January 1933.

WWII 

After Nazi Germany's invasion of the Second Polish Republic in September 1939, many members of the German minority (around 25%) joined the ethnic German paramilitary organisation Volksdeutscher Selbstschutz. When the German occupation of Poland began, the Selbstschutz took an active part in Nazi crimes against ethnic Poles. Due to their pre-war interactions with the Polish majority, they were able to prepare lists of Polish intellectuals and civil servants whom the Nazis selected for extermination. The organisation actively participated and was responsible for the deaths of about 50,000 Poles.

Following the outbreak of World War II in September 1939, the Soviets annexed a massive portion of the eastern part of Poland (November 1939) in the wake of an August 1939 agreement between the Reich and the USSR. During the German occupation of Poland during World War II (1939-1945), the Nazis forcibly resettled ethnic Germans from other areas of Central Europe (such as the Baltic states) in the pre-war territory of Poland. At the same time the Nazi authorities expelled, enslaved and killed Poles and Jews.

After the Nazis' defeat in 1945, Poland did not regain its Soviet-annexed territory; instead, Polish communists, directed by the Soviets, expelled the remaining Germans who had not been evacuated or fled before from the areas of Lower Silesia, Upper Silesia, Pomerania, East Brandenburg, and East Prussia and made Poles take their place, some of whom were expelled from Soviet-occupied areas that had previously formed part of Poland. About half of East Prussia became the newly created Soviet territory of Kaliningrad Oblast (officially established in 1946), where Soviet citizens replaced the former German residents. Claims to a border along the Oder-Neisse line were presented at the Potsdam Conference of August 1945 by a delegation of Polish politicians. The Potsdam Conference's results eventually specified or endorsed the shifting of borders pending a later Peace Treaty.  In the following years, the communists and activists inspired by the Myśl zachodnia strived to "de-Germanize" and to "re-Polonize" the huge land, propagandistically termed Recovered Territories.

Following the downfall of the Polish Communist regime in 1989, the German minorities' political situation in modern-day Poland has improved, and after Poland joined the European Union in the 2004 enlargement and was incorporated into the Schengen Area, German citizens are now allowed to buy land and property in the areas where they or their ancestors used to live, and can return there if they wish. However, none of their properties have been returned after being confiscated.

A possible demonstration of the ambiguity of the Polish-German minority position can be seen in the life and career of Waldemar Kraft, a minister without portfolio in the West German Bundestag during the 1950s. However, most of the German minority had not been as involved in the Nazi system as Kraft was.

There is no clear-cut division in Poland between the Germans and some other minorities, whose heritage is similar in some respects due to centuries of assimilation, Germanisation and intermarriage, but differs in other respects due to either ancient regional West Slavic roots or Polonisation. Examples of such  minorities include the Slovincians (Lebakaschuben), the Masurians and the Silesians of Upper Silesia. While in the past these people have been claimed for both Polish and German ethnicity, it really depends on their self-perception which they choose to belong to.

German Poles

German Poles may refer to either Poles of German descent or sometimes to Polish citizens whose ancestors held German citizenship before World War II, regardless of their ethnicity.

After the flight and expulsion of Germans from Poland, the largest of a series of flights and expulsions of Germans in Europe during and after World War II, over 1 million former citizens of Germany were naturalized and granted Polish citizenship. Some of them were forced to stay in Poland, while others wanted to stay because these territories were inhabited by their families for hundreds of years. The lowest estimate by West German Schieder commission of 1953, is that 910,000 former German citizens were granted Polish citizenship by 1950. Higher estimates say that 1,043,550 or 1,165,000 were naturalized as Polish citizens by 1950.

Post-WWII 

However, the vast majority of those people were the so-called "autochthons" who were allowed to stay in post-war Poland after declaring Polish ethnicity in a special verification process. Therefore, most of them were inhabitants of Polish descent of the pre-war border regions of Upper Silesia and Warmia-Masuria. Sometimes they were called Wasserpolnisch or Wasserpolak. Despite their ethnic background, they were allowed to reclaim their former German citizenship on application and under German Basic Law were "considered as not having been deprived of their German citizenship if they have established their domicile in Germany after May 8, 1945 and have not expressed a contrary intention." Because of this fact many of them left the People's Republic of Poland due to its undemocratic political system and economic problems.

It is estimated that, in the Cold War era, hundreds of thousands of Polish citizens decided to emigrate to West Germany and, to a lesser extent, to East Germany.  Despite that, hundreds or tens of thousands of former German citizens remained in Poland. Some of them created families with other Poles, who, in the vast majority, were settlers from central Poland or were resettled from the former eastern territories of Poland by the Soviets to the Recovered Territories (Former eastern territories of Germany).

Education

There is one German international school in Poland, Willy-Brandt-Schule in Warsaw.

Notable Poles of German descent

 Władysław Anders, (1892 in Warsaw – 1970 in London) general, leader of the Polish 2nd Corps during World War II and prominent member of the Polish government-in-exile in London.
 Grzegorz Braun,  (born 1967 in Toruń) journalist, academic lecturer, movie director, screenwriter and far-right politician.
 Izabela Czartoryska, (1746 in Warsaw – 1835 in Wysocko) noblewoman née Flemming, writer, art collector, and founder of the first Polish museum, the Czartoryski Museum in Kraków.
 Jan Henryk Dąbrowski, (1755 in Pierzchów – 1818 in Winna Góra) general and Polish national hero.
 Stanisław Ernest Denhoff, (1673 in Kościerzyna– 1728 in Gdansk) noble, politician and military leader.
 Karol Estreicher (senior), (1827 in Kraków – 1908 in Kraków) father of Polish Bibliography and a founder of the Polish Academy of Learning.
 Adam Fastnacht, (1913 in Sanok - 1987 in Wrocław) historian and member of Armia Krajowa.
 Jan Fethke, (1903 in Opole – 1980 in Berlin) film director, author and famous proponent of Esperanto language.
 Emil August Fieldorf, (1895 in Krakow – 1953 in Warsaw) Polish general during World War I and World War II.
 Franciszek Fiszer, (1860 in Ostrołęka – 1937 in Warsaw) author, bon-vivant and philosopher.
 Mark Forster, (born 1983 in Kaiserslautern), singer, songwriter and TV personality
 Anna German, (1936 in Urgench – 1982 in Warsaw) popular singer 
 Małgorzata Gersdorf, (born 1952 in Warsaw) lawyer, judge, Head of Supreme Court of Poland
 Wanda Gertz, (1896 in Warsaw – 1958 in London) decorated officer in the Polish Army during World War II 
 Roman Giertych, (born 1971 in Śrem) lawyer, advocate, former Deputy Prime Minister
 Kamil Glik, (born 1988 in Jastrzębie-Zdrój) professional footballer who plays for Serie A club Torino and the Poland national football team.
 Henryk Grohman,  (1862 in Łódź – 1939) industrialist.
 Józef Haller,  (1873 in Jurczyce – 1960 in London) Polish general, political and social activist
 Marek Jędraszewski, (born 1949 in Poznań) Archbishop of Kraków since 2016 (his mother was connected with Bambers)
 Miroslav Klose, (born 1978 in Opole) professional footballer, Germany national football team and FIFA World Cup all-time top goalscorer, and former striker for Italian football club S.S. Lazio.
 Maximilian Kolbe, (1894 in Zduńska Wola – 1941 in Auschwitz) a Polish Conventual Franciscan friar, executed and subsequently canonised.
 Henryk Korowicz,  (1888 in Malinówka – 1941 in Lwów) professor, economist, and rector of Academy of Foreign Trade in Lwów.
 Janusz Korwin-Mikke, (born 1942 in Warsaw) controversial politician and writer.
 Gustaf Kossinna, (1858 in Tilsit – 1931 in Berlin) linguist and archaeologist.
 Juliusz Karol Kunitzer, (1843 in Przedbórz – 1905 in Łódź) industrialist, economic activist and industrial magnate in Congress Poland.
 Karolina Lanckorońska, (1898 in Gars am Kamp — 2002 in Rome) like her father, (Count Karol Lanckoroński) an art collector and philanthropist.
 Joachim Lelewel, (1786 in Warsaw – 1861 in Paris) a Polish historian and politician.
 Samuel Linde, (1771 in Toruń – 1847 in Warsaw) linguist, librarian and lexicographer of the Polish language.
 Tadeusz Manteuffel, (1902 in Rēzekne – 1970 in Warsaw) historian.
 Suzanna von Nathusius, (born in 2000) child actor.
 Wilhelm Orlik-Rückemann, (1894 in Lviv – 1986 in Ottawa) Polish general and military commander.
 Emilia Plater, (1806 in Vilnius – 1831 in Vainežeris) noblewoman and revolutionary.
 Lukas Podolski (born 1985 in Gliwice) a German professional footballer who plays for Górnik Zabrze
 Nelli Rokita, (born 1957 in Chelyabinsk) politician of Law and Justice party in Poland.
 Piotr Steinkeller, (1799 in Krakow - 1854 in Krakow) early industrialist and banker
 Jerzy Stuhr, (born 1947 in Krakow) film actor and director 
 Romuald Traugutt, (1826 – 1864 in Warsaw) a "dictator" of the January Uprising
 Donald Tusk, (born 1957 in Gdańsk) former Prime Minister of Poland, former President of the European Council.
 Jozef Unrug, (1884 in Brandenburg an der Havel – 1973 in Lailly-en-Val) Prussian-born Polish admiral who helped to form the Polish Navy in independent Poland, inmate of Colditz.
 Karol Ernest Wedel, (1813–1902) notable confectioner.
 Edward Werner, (1878 in Warsaw – 1945 in New York City) economist, judge and politician in the Second Polish Republic.

German media in Poland 
 Schlesisches Wochenblatt
 Polen-Rundschau
 Schlesien Aktuell – a German-language radio station from Opole
 Polskie Radio – public-service radio with online German edition (Deutsche Redaktion), as well as broadcasts in German
 Polen am Morgen – online newspaper, published daily since 1998

See also  
 Germany–Poland relations
 Waldemar Kraft
 Bilingual communes in Poland
 German Minority (political party)
 Germans in the Czech Republic
 Polish minority in Germany
 Olędrzy
 Vistula Germans in Russian Poland
 Bambrzy
 Volksdeutsche

Notes

References

 Dual Citizenship in Opole Silesia in the Context of European Integration, Tomasz Kamusella, Opole University, in Facta Universitatis, series Philosophy, Sociology and Psychology, Vol 2, No 10, 2003, pp. 699–716

Further reading 
 de Zayas, Alfred M.: Die deutschen Vertriebenen. Graz, 2006. .
 de Zayas, Alfred M.: Heimatrecht ist Menschenrecht. München, 2001..
 de Zayas, Alfred M.: A terrible Revenge. New York, 1994. .
 de Zayas, Alfred M.: Nemesis at Potsdam. London, 1977. .
 de Zayas, Alfred M.: 50 Thesen zur Vertreibung. München, 2008. .
 Douglas, R.M.: Orderly and Humane. The Expulsion of the Germans after the Second World War. Yale University Press. .
 Kleineberg A., Marx, Ch., Knobloch E., Lelgemann D.: Germania und die Insel Thule. Die Entschlüsselung vo Ptolemaios: "Atlas der Oikumene". Wissenschaftliche Buchgesellschaft, 2010.
 Matelski Dariusz, Niemcy w Polsce w XX wieku (Deutschen in Polen im 20. Jahrhundert), Wydawnictwo Naukowe PWN, Warszawa-Poznań 1999.
 Matelski Dariusz, Niemcy w II Rzeczypospolitej (1918-1939) [Die Deutschen in der Zweiten Republik Polen (1918-1939)], Wydawnictwo Adam Marszałek, Toruń 2018 cz. 1 [Bd. 1], ss. 611, il., mapy.
 Matelski Dariusz,  Niemcy w II Rzeczypospolitej (1918-1939[Die Deutschen in der Zweiten Republik Polen (1918-1939)]), Wydawnictwo Adam Marszałek, Toruń 2018 cz. 2[Bd. 1] , ss. 624, Abstract (s. 264–274), Zusammenfassung (s. 275–400).
 Naimark, Norman: Fires of Hatred. Ethnic Cleansing in Twentieth-Century Europe. Cambridge Harvard Press, 2001.
 Prauser, Steffen and Rees, Arfon: The Expulsion of the "German" Communities from Eastern Europe at the End of the Second World War. Florence, Italy, European University Institute, 2004.
 
 
 
 

Germany–Poland relations
Poland